The 1982 New Orleans Saints season saw the team nearly qualify for the NFL playoffs, missing it by a tiebreaker. The Saints finished with a 4–5 record, and narrowly missed the playoffs in a complicated labyrinth of tie-breakers.

Offseason

NFL draft

Personnel

Staff

Roster

Regular season

Schedule 

Note: Intra-division opponents are in bold text.

Standings

References

External links 
 1982 New Orleans Saints at Pro-Football-Reference.com

New Orleans Saints
New Orleans Saints seasons
New